The Commander of the Air Force is the professional head of the Sri Lanka Air Force.  The current Commander of the Air Force is Air Marshal Sudarshana Pathirana. It is a position comparable to that of Chief of the Air Staff of the Royal Air Force. The Chief of Staff of the Air Force acts as a deputy commander within the command structure.

All serving air force commanders have been of the rank of air marshal, promoted to the honorary rank of air chief marshal on retirement or on promotion to Chief of Defence Staff (CDS).

List of commanders

See also
 Sri Lanka Air Force
 Commander of the Army
 Commander of the Navy

References

 
Sri Lanka Air Force
Sri Lanka Air Force air marshals
Air force appointments
Air Force
Sri Lanka
Lists of Sri Lankan military personnel